Hamori may refer to:

People
András Hámori, Hungarian film producer
Ferenc Hamori (born 1972), former Hungarian footballer
Jenő Hámori (economist), Hungarian economist
Jenő Hámori (fencer) (born 1933), Hungarian fencer 
József Hámori (1932–2021), Hungarian biologist and politician

Places
Lake Hámori, lake in Hungary
Hamori, South Korea, a town on the south coast of Jeju island
 Hamori (crater), a large crater in the southern hemisphere of the dwarf planet Ceres

Hungarian-language surnames